Rotorua Boys' High School is a state school educating boys from Year 9 to Year 13. It is situated just outside the Rotorua CBD at the intersection of Old Taupo Road and Pukuatua Street in Rotorua, New Zealand.

History

Rotorua Boys' High School had its beginnings as the Rotorua High and Grammar School, founded in 1927 to replace the earlier Rotorua District High School (1914–1926). By 1956 it had a roll in excess of 1200 students.  The Intermediate Department was closed when Rotorua Intermediate School was established in 1957. 
The Rotorua High School was further split to make room for a growing population of the district and its educational needs when, in 1959 Rotorua Girls' High School was opened. Rotorua High School was then established as Rotorua Boys' High School and commenced to function as a state secondary school for boys with a roll of 640 pupils in February 1959.

Principals 

Rotorua District High School
 John Warn (1914–1915)
 Francis Wood (1915–1919)
 Thomas Tanner (1916-1918) (While Wood was serving in World War I)
 William Lewins (1920–1926)
 George Barber (1926)
Rotorua High and Grammar School
 Aby Ryder (1927–1931)
 Bill Harwood (1932–1959)
Rotorua Boys' High School
 Neville Thornton (1960–1962)
 Ted Hamill (1963–1979)
 Geoffrey Cramond (1980–1991)
 Chris Grinter (1991 – present)

A book about Rotorua Boys' High School's history was published in 2007 and can be bought in bookstores around Rotorua.

Houses

From 1927 till 2020, Rotorua Boys' High School's four houses were known as Drake, Frobisher, Nelson and Raleigh, after great British explorers and seafarers. At the end of 2020, in a climate influenced by the American Black Lives Matter movement, and supported by evidence that each of the four British namesakes had varying levels of involvement with slavery, the houses were given new names. These new names, which were also felt to be more relevant to the pupils of today, came into effect at the beginning of 2021:

 Ngongotaha — red, formerly known as Drake
 Te Akitu a Raukura — yellow, formerly known as Frobisher
 Te Rotoruanui-a-Kahu — blue, formerly known as Nelson
 Utuhina — green, formerly known as Raleigh

Hostel

Rotorua Boys' High School officially opened the Tai Mitchell Hostel, a new onsite boarding facility, in 2005 at a cost of $3.5 million. The facility is designed to accommodate 104 students which represents over 10 percent of the school roll.

The Ministry of Education appointed a limited statutory manager late in 2009 to investigate alleged mismanagement, inappropriate drug-testing and financial issues regarding the school hostel.
In June 2010 the limited statutory manager reported that, following his investigation, he had found that the school had no case to answer.

Families whose children have been excluded from the school's Tai Mitchell Hostel complained about unfair treatment. They believed their sons were targeted for inappropriate drug test procedures and inappropriate action taken after drug tests were performed. The statutory manager appointed by the Ministry of Education to look into the school's procedures, Dennis Finn, told The Daily Post he has cleared Mr Grinter and Mr Whata and had full confidence in them. Mr Finn said the report and its findings were only a small part of the bigger picture. The real issue was the serious breach by students of the rules of the school or hostels, he said. "Drugs; whether use of, in possession of, or supply of, will not be tolerated or accepted." 
Mr Finn told The Daily Post he held a meeting between the mother and Mr Grinter and believed the issue had been resolved. The boys had since been reinstated at the school.

Notable alumni

The Arts 
 Alan Duff — author
 Sir Howard Morrison — musician
  Jordi Webber — member of boy band Titanium

Broadcasting 
 Neil Waka — TVNZ presenter

Politics 
 Percy Allen — National Party politician

Sport 
 Israel Adesanya — mixed martial artist in the Ultimate Fighting Championship, former UFC Middleweight Champion
 Sam Bewley — cyclist, team pursuit (Beijing Olympics 2008)
 Garrick Cowley — rugby union player (Manu Samoa)
 Mike Delany — rugby union player (All Blacks)
 Tom Donnelly — rugby union player (All Blacks)
 Robbie Eastham — shooter
 Teimana Harrison — rugby union player (Northampton Saints and England)
 Dylan Hartley — rugby union player (Northampton Saints and England)
 Danny Lee — golfer
 Adam McGeorge — footballer (All Whites, Oly-Whites 2012)
 Liam Messam — rugby union player (All Blacks, Waikato, Chiefs, captain of the Commonwealth Games winning sevens team)
 Sam Messam — footballer
 Craig Newby — rugby union player (All Blacks, Otago, North Harbour, Highlanders, Leicester Tigers, 7’s World Cup winner, 7’s Manchester Commonwealth games Gold medal winner) 
 Ben Sandford — skeleton sledder and Winter Olympian
 Isaac Te Aute — rugby Union Player (Rotorua Boys' High School First XV Captain), New Zealand Sevens
 Mike Walker — kayaker

Notes

External links 
 rbhs.school.nz – Official website

Boys' schools in New Zealand
Secondary schools in the Bay of Plenty Region
Schools in Rotorua
1927 establishments in New Zealand
Educational institutions established in 1927